Kenneth Pattisson (12 December 1916 – 13 July 2002) was a Royal Navy Fleet Air Arm pilot credited by some (most notably his own son) with fatally crippling the  on 26 May 1941 whilst flying a Fairey Swordfish biplane. Pattisson was awarded the Distinguished Service Cross for his service during the war.

At the time of the attack no official statement was made as to whose torpedo hit Bismarck. Following the recovery of Bismarck in 1998, many historians and the official Royal Navy press release credit John Moffat with that attack

Early life
Pattisson grew up in Southsea, Hampshire, and then moved to the Isle of Wight. He attended Newport grammar school.

Royal Navy career
Pattisson took a short-service commission in the Fleet Air Arm in the last months of peace prior to the Second World War.

Second World War and the attack on Bismarck

After Germany sank , a number of Royal Navy ships were tasked with the destruction of the German battleship Bismarck. Amongst these was the aircraft carrier  where Pattisson was stationed.  On 26 May 1941, the RAF spotted Bismarck  from Ark Royal.  Pattisson's squadron was launched to intercept, but poor weather made identification difficult and the squadron targeted the British  by mistake. Of the 14 planes in the attack, only three pilots, including Pattisson, recognized the silhouette as that of Sheffield and not Bismarck and held their fire.  Later that evening, another sortie of 15 aircraft was launched and Bismarck was attacked. Two torpedoes struck home, one amidships on its port side resulting in slow flooding, and the second in the steering area. Without the ability to hold a course, Bismarck was unable to reach port. After being attacked by other British ships,  Bismarck was scuttled by her crew to avoid capture.

Korean War
In the Korean war, Pattisson led a Firefly squadron on the carrier .

Retirement and personal life
He retired from the Navy, as a lieutenant-commander in 1958, after more than 400 sorties at sea.

He was married in 1939 and had two sons and two daughters.

References

 Simon de Bruxelles article in the London Times dated 28 October 2017

Royal Navy officers
British World War II pilots
British World War II bomber pilots
Fleet Air Arm aviators
1916 births
2002 deaths
Fleet Air Arm personnel of World War II